Dag Midling (born 18 November 1946) is a Norwegian fencer. He competed in the individual épée event at the 1968 Summer Olympics.

References

External links
 

1946 births
Living people
Norwegian male épée fencers
Olympic fencers of Norway
Fencers at the 1968 Summer Olympics
Sportspeople from Oslo
20th-century Norwegian people